Noorhaqmal Mohamed Noor (b. 1984) – also known as Aqmal N., is a Singaporean singer, musician, composer and producer. His song, "Warkah Cinta Dunia" (2009) has been distributed worldwide in internet websites such as Amazon, Rhapsody, iTunes, Napster, eMusic, SonicTap, ShockHound, Spotify, iMesh and Nokia.

He was the winner of Suria Mediacorp 2004, runner-up for Mediacorp Power 98FM "Army Icon" (2005) and Mediacorp Ria 98.7FM "Ria Remix" (2006), singer of winning song "Suara Itu" for Esplanade SingaRaya (2007), top five for Mediacorp Warna 94.2FM and Ria 89.7FM "Projek Rentak" (2008) and winner of Mediacorp Warna 94.2FM and Ria 89.7FM "Projek Rentak" (2009), with song entitled Warkah Cinta Dunia.

A singer/songwriter who has won most of Mediacorp's major competitions since winning Mediacorp Suria's Anugerah in 2004. First musician, singer/songwriter to have a research paper titled Muzik, Bahasa dan Media Baru (Music, Language and New Media) published in Bahasa Sumber Intelektual Peribumi (2009), a compilation of research papers on Malay language by experts of various fields. Literary activist and has published works, namely Awan Tak Larat in Jurnal Akademik Jilid VII (2007), Drama Waktu Sesudah Itu mengungkap pengalaman pendokumentasian in Jurnal Akademik Jilid VIII (2008), Pembelot in "Aku Ingin Menulis: Panduan Mudah Menulis Cerpen” and “Teman Siber” (2009), Pengaruh bahasa dalam seni kata dikir Singapura in Jurnal Akademik Jilid IX (2009), Representasi Puisi dalam pelbagai media dari sudut genetik in Jurnal Akademik Jilid IX (2009), Hitam in “Kasih Bunga Merah”(2009) and Muzik dan Pembelajaran: Satu penelitian in Jurnal Akademik Jilid IX (2009).

In 2021, Aqmal N was commissioned by National Museum of Singapore to create a poem, Tanah Sang Perwira (A Hero's Land), to mark the reopening of Reflections at Bukit Chandu.

Personal life 
On 15 December 2012, Aqmal N had a stroke and was admitted to Changi General Hospital.

Bibliography

References

 (2008). “Dikir Singapura dalam Rangka Exodus dan Genesis”, Jurnal Akademik Jilid VIII, Singapura, STP-NIE/NTU
 (2009). “Bahasa, Muzik dan Media Baharu”, Bahasa Sumber Intelektual Peribumi, Singapura, Angkatan Sasterawan ‘50
 (2009). “Menjunjung Titah”, Berita Harian, Singapura, Singapore Press Holdings
 (2007). Awan Tak Larat in Jurnal Akademik Jilid VII, Singapura, STP-NIE/NTU
 (2008). “Drama Waktu Sesudah Itu mengungkap pengalaman pendokumentasian” in Jurnal Akademik Jilid VIII, Singapura, STP-NIE/NTU
 (2009). Pembelot in “Aku Ingin Menulis: Panduan Mudah Menulis Cerpen” by Yazid Hussein. Asas 50 Press
 (2009). Pembelot in “Teman Siber” by (Ed.) Yazid Hussein. Angkatan Sasterawan ‘50
 (2009). “Pengaruh bahasa dalam seni kata dikir Singapura” in Jurnal Akademik Jilid IX, Singapura, STP-NIE/NTU
 (2009). “Representasi Puisi dalam pelbagai media dari sudut genetik” in Jurnal Akademik Jilid IX, Singapura, STP-NIE/NTU
 (2009). Hitam in “Kasih Bunga Merah” by (Ed.) Yazid Hussein. Angkatan Sasterawan ‘50
 (2009). “Muzik dan Pembelajaran: Satu penelitian” in Jurnal Akademik Jilid IX, Singapura, STP-NIE/NTU

Singaporean musicians
Living people
1984 births
Singaporean people of Malay descent